The men's 100 metres sprint event at the 1948 Olympic Games in London, England, we held at Wembley Stadium on 30 and 31 July. Sixty-three athletes from 33 nations competed; each nation was limited to 3 runners by rules set at the 1930 Olympic Congress. The final was won by American Harrison Dillard, in a photo finish. Lloyd LaBeach of Panama won his nation's first medal in the men's 100 metres, a bronze. This was the first time a photo finish camera was used at an Olympic Games. The photo finish equipment consisted of a photoelectric cell, called the Magic Eye, produced by Swiss watchmaker Omega and a slit photography camera produced by the British Race Finish Recording Company.

Background

This was the eleventh time the event was held, having appeared at every Olympics since the first in 1896. With a 12 year gap due to World War II, none of the athletes from the 1936 edition returned. Notable entrants and favorites were American Mel Patton and Panamanian Lloyd LaBeach. American Barney Ewell was a "top sprinter" but "felt to be slightly past his prime." The third member of the United States team was Harrison Dillard, a hurdles specialist who had also entered the 100 metres and came in third at the U.S. Olympic trials.

Bermuda, Burma, Guyana, Iraq, Jamaica, Pakistan, Panama, Trinidad and Tobago, and Uruguay were represented in the event for the first time. The United States was the only nation to have appeared at each of the first eleven Olympic men's 100 metres events.

Competition format

The event retained the four round format from 1920–1936: heats, quarterfinals, semifinals, and a final. There were 12 heats, of 4–7 athletes each, with the top 2 in each heat advancing to the quarterfinals. The 24 quarterfinalists were placed into 4 heats of 6 athletes. The top 3 in each quarterfinal advanced to the semifinals. There were 2 heats of 6 semifinalists, once again with the top 3 advancing to the 6-man final.

Records

Prior to the competition, the existing world and Olympic records were as follows.

Harrison Dillard of the United States matched the Olympic record in the final.

Schedule

All times are British Summer Time (UTC+1).

Results

Round 1

The fastest two runners in each of the twelve heats advanced to the second round. Official hand-timed results are known (and provided in the Official Report) only for the top three in each heat; unofficial auto-timed results are shown in parentheses.

Heat 1

Heat 2

Heat 3

Heat 4

Heat 5

Heat 6

Heat 7

Heat 8

Heat 9

Heat 10

Heat 11

The tailwind of 3.3 m/s made this heat ineligible for records purposes.

Heat 12

Quarterfinals

The fastest three runners in each of the four heats advanced to the semifinal round. Official hand-timed results are known (and provided in the Official Report) only for the top three in each heat; unofficial auto-timed results are shown in parentheses.

Quarterfinal 1

Quarterfinal 2

Quarterfinal 3

Quarterfinal 4

Semifinals

The fastest three runners in each of the two heats advanced to the final round. Official hand-timed results are known (and provided in the Official Report) only for the top three in each heat; unofficial auto-timed results are shown in parentheses.

Semifinal 1

Semifinal 2

Final

Patton "got off to a disastrous start and was not a factor." Dillard led the entire way. Official hand-timed results are known (and provided in the Official Report) only for the top three in each heat; unofficial auto-timed results are shown in parentheses.

References

External links
Organising Committee for the XIV Olympiad, The (1948). The Official Report of the Organising Committee for the XIV Olympiad. LA84 Foundation. Retrieved 4 September 2016.

Athletics at the 1948 Summer Olympics
100 metres at the Olympics
Men's events at the 1948 Summer Olympics